The French Constitution of 1793 was approved by a referendum in the summer of 1793. It was held via universal male suffrage, with voting on different days in different departments, in some cases after the result was proclaimed in Paris on 9 August 1793. While most voters abstained, of those who voted, 99.41% majority approved. The events took place during the French Revolution and the Constitution never came into effect.

Outcome

French voters approved the French Constitution of 1793 with an official result of 99.41% of those voting in favor, although voter turnout was under 30%.

References
 

Referendums in France
1793 referendums
1793 events of the French Revolution
Constitutional referendums in France
1793 elections in France